Sri Pushparama Vihara is a historic Buddhist temple situated in Ratmalana, Western province, Sri Lanka. It is located at Sri Dharmarama junction on the Colombo-Galle main road. The temple has been formally recognised by the Government as an archaeological site in Sri Lanka. The designation was declared on 23 February 2007 under the government Gazette number 1486.

See also
Sri Pushparama Vihara, Balapitiya

References

Buddhist temples in Colombo District
Archaeological protected monuments in Colombo District